In Aztec mythology, Citlalatonac  created the stars along with his wife, Citlalicue.  This pair of gods are sometimes associated with the first pair of humans, Nata and Nena.

References

Aztec gods
Aztec mythology and religion
Mesoamerican mythology and religion
Stellar gods